The 1874 Launceston by-election was fought on 3 July 1874.  The byelection was fought due to the void Election of the incumbent Conservative MP, James Henry Deakin (senior).  It was won by his son, the Conservative candidate James Henry Deakin (junior).

References

1874 in England
1874 elections in the United Kingdom
By-elections to the Parliament of the United Kingdom in Cornish constituencies
19th century in Cornwall
July 1874 events
Launceston, Cornwall